Bussing is a surname. Notable people with the surname Bussing or Busing include:

Hans Büsing (1880–1941), German diplomat
Wilhelm Büsing (Wehrmacht) (1901–1945), recipient of the German Knight's Cross of the Iron Cross during World War II
Wilhelm Büsing (born 1921), German equestrian
Laura Bussing (born 1964), American motorcycle racer
John Busing (born 1983), American football safety
William Albert Bussing (1933–2014), American ichthyologist working mainly in Central America

See also
 Busse
 Bussing (disambiguation)